"He's Gonna Step on You Again" (also known as "Step On") is a song originally performed by John Kongos, co-written by Kongos and Christos Demetriou, and first released in 1971 by Fly Records. It entered the UK Singles Chart on 22 May 1971 and spent 14 weeks there, peaking at No. 4. Covers of the song have been chart successes several times, including for Happy Mondays in 1990.

It was cited in the Guinness Book of Records as being the first song to have used a sample. However, according to the sleeve note of the CD reissue of the Kongos album, it is actually a tape loop of African drumming, and the use of tape loops and instruments using prerecorded samples such as the Mellotron and Optigan was well established by this time.

Chart performance

Cover versions

1987 Australian versions
In 1987 three Australian bands (The Party Boys, Chantoozies and Exploding White Mice) each released their own cover version of "He's Gonna Step on You Again". The Party Boys' single was issued in May, and peaked at No. 1, for two weeks, in late July on the Australian Music Report chart while the Chantoozies version reached No. 36.

The Party Boys
The Party Boys were an Australian rock band with a floating membership that mostly performed cover versions and existed from 1982 until 1992. By 1987, the members were Kevin Borich on guitar and backing vocals, John Brewster on guitar and backing vocals, Paul Christie on drums and backing vocals, Richard Harvey on drums, Alan Lancaster on bass guitar and backing vocals, and John Swan on lead vocals. Their version also reached No. 10 on the New Zealand Singles Chart. The Party Boys also recorded a 12" single, "He's Gonna Step on You Again" (Stomp mix) with Nick Mainsbridge remixing, which was backed by "She's a Mystery".

Chantoozies

The Chantoozies released a version in 1987 as the second single from their debut studio album Chantoozies. The song peaked at number 36 on the Australian Kent Music Report.

Track listings
7" single (K301)
Side A "He's Gonna Step on You Again"
Side B "Twenty Six 02"

12" single (X 14504)
Side A "He's Gonna Step on You Again" 
Side B1 "He's Gonna Step on You Again" 
Side B2 "Twenty Six 02"

Charts

Happy Mondays version

English band Happy Mondays covered the song in 1990, retitling it "Step On", with two different music videos. It was originally intended as a contribution to the Rubáiyát: Elektra's 40th Anniversary compilation for their US label Elektra, but they decided to keep it to release as a single, and instead covered Kongos's "Tokoloshe Man" for the compilation. The Happy Mondays version incorporates a short sample of three guitar notes from the original.

"Step On" became Happy Mondays' biggest-selling single, peaking at No. 5 in the UK and No. 57 on the US Billboard Hot 100 chart. The lyric "you're twisting my melon, man" was used for singer Shaun Ryder's autobiography Twisting My Melon.

Charts
Weekly charts

Year-end charts

Certifications

See also
List of number-one singles in Australia during the 1980s

References

1971 songs
1971 debut singles
1987 singles
1990 singles
Ariola Records singles
CBS Records singles
Mushroom Records singles
Chantoozies songs
Factory Records singles
Fly Records singles
Happy Mondays songs
John Kongos songs
Number-one singles in Australia
Song recordings produced by Gus Dudgeon
Songs written by John Kongos